The 2009 Absa Currie Cup First Division season was contested from 11 July through to 16 October. The Currie Cup is an annual domestic competition for provincial rugby union teams in South Africa.

The Currie Cup tournament (also known as the Absa Currie Cup for sponsorship reasons) is South Africa's premier domestic rugby union competition, featuring teams representing either entire provinces or substantial regions within provinces.

The 2008 Champions The Griffons won their first Currie Cup First Division trophy by winning the Currie Cup First Division Final, against the Platinum Leopards in Potchefstroom on 10 October 2008, by 31 – 26.

The 2009 Champions The Pumas won their second Currie Cup First Division trophy by winning the Currie Cup First Division Final, against the SWD Eagles in Witbank on 16 October 2009, by 47 - 19.

Current Standings

Updated 6 October 2009:

Points Breakdown
Four points for a win
Two points for a draw
One bonus point for a loss by seven points or less
One bonus point for scoring four or more tries in a match

Table Notes
P = Played
W = Won
D = Drawn
L = Lost
PF = points for
PA = Points Against
PD = Points Difference (PF - PA)
TF = Tries For
TA = Tries Against
BP = Bonus points
Pts = Total Points

Teams
 Border Bulldogs
 Griffons
 Mighty Elephants
 Pumas
 SWD Eagles
 Valke

Fixtures and results
 Fixtures are subject to change.
 All times are South African (GMT+2).

Compulsory Friendlies

July 2009

August 2009

September 2009

October 2009

Knock Out Stage

Semi finals

Final

Promotion/relegation Matches

Round 1

Round 2

The Pumas are promoted to the Premier Division while the Boland Cavaliers are relegated to the First Division. The Platinum Leopards retain their place in the Premier Division while the SWD Eagles remain in the First Division.

References

 Currie Cup
 ABSA

External links
 

2009
2009 Currie Cup